Christina Krotkova worked in the Office of War Information (OWI) during World War II.  The OWI handled war news for domestic use and overseas propaganda.  Krotkova's chief target was Soviet defector Victor Kravchenko.  Haynes and Klehr have identified Krotkova as allegedly using several code names with Soviet intelligence whom she transmitted information to.  At least seven Venona project transcripts refer to Kratkova. Haynes and Klehr identify Krotkova as code name "Zhanna", "Jeanne", "Ola", and "Ols".  A difference of opinion arises on the latter two code names with Nigel West, who identifies "Ola" and "Ols" as being Sara Veksler, who also worked within OWI.

Sources
John Earl Haynes and Harvey Klehr, Venona: Decoding Soviet Espionage in America (New Haven: Yale University Press, 1999)
Nigel West, Venona: The Greatest Secret of the Cold War (London: HarperCollins, 1999)

Year of birth missing
Year of death missing
American spies for the Soviet Union
American people in the Venona papers
Place of birth missing
People of the United States Office of War Information